Belton Independent School District is a public school district based in Belton, Texas (USA).

Finances
As of the 2010–2011 school year, the appraised valuation of property in the district was $1,975,956,000. The maintenance tax rate was $0.117 and the bond tax rate was $0.025 per $100 of appraised valuation.

Academic achievement
In 2011, the school district was rated "academically acceptable" by the Texas Education Agency.

Schools
In the 2021-2022 school year, Belton ISD had eighteen schools open.

Regular instructional

High Schools (Grades 9-12)
Belton High School
Lake Belton High School
Belton New Tech High School @ Waskow
Middle Schools (Grades 6-8)
Belton Middle School (2020–present)
 North Belton Middle School
South Belton Middle School (2011–present)
Lake Belton Middle School (2005–present)
Elementary Schools (Grades PK/K-5)
Charter Oak Elementary School
Joe M. Pirtle Elementary School
Lakewood Elementary School
Leon Heights Elementary School
Miller Heights Elementary School
Southwest Elementary School
Sparta Elementary School
Chisholm Trail Elementary School
Tarver Elementary School
High Point Elementary School
Belton Early Childhood School (Pre-K only)

JJAEP instructional
Bell County JJAEP

Previous campuses
Tyler Elementary (1960-2014)
Belton Jr. High School (1972-2005)
Central Elementary (1973-1999)
Tarver Intermediate School (2000-2005)
Belton Intermediate School (1993-2005)
Belton Middle School (2005-2014)

See also

List of school districts in Texas

References

External links

School districts in Bell County, Texas